Bruchidius is a genus of beetles in the bean weevil subfamily (Bruchinae) of the leaf beetle family, Chrysomelidae. Most are native to the Old World.

The larvae of these beetles often feed on plants of the legume family, Fabaceae. The species Bruchidius siliquastri, for example, is a seed beetle named for its host, the Judas tree (Cercis siliquastrum). It lives on other Cercis species, as well. One of several groups within the genus, the B. centromaculatus group, are mostly limited to acacias. The genus can also be found on plants of the carrot and parsley family, Apiaceae, and the aster family, Asteraceae.

There are around 300 species in this genus.

Species include:
Bruchidius antennatus
Bruchidius biguttatus
Bruchidius chloroticus
Bruchidius cisti
Bruchidius faroensis
Bruchidius holosericeus
Bruchidius lichenicola
Bruchidius lineatopygus
Bruchidius lutescens
Bruchidius meridionalis
Bruchidius nodieri
Bruchidius obscurevittatus
Bruchidius pauper
Bruchidius raddianae
Bruchidius siliquastri
Bruchidius simulans
Bruchidius unicolor
Bruchidius villosus – Scotch broom bruchid

Gallery

References

Chrysomelidae genera
Bruchinae